Edward Joseph Kennedy (born Cavan, 1851) was an Irish politician. He was elected as an Irish Nationalist Member of Parliament for South Sligo in 1887, resigning in 1888 by becoming Steward of the Manor of Northstead. He was Lord Mayor of Dublin in 1890.

References

External links
  

Irish Parliamentary Party MPs
Members of the Parliament of the United Kingdom for County Sligo constituencies (1801–1922)
1851 births
Year of death missing
UK MPs 1886–1892
Lord Mayors of Dublin